Original Recordings is a compilation album by Elkie Brooks. It was issued on CD and double cassette in 1993 through Castle Records.

Track listing 
"No More the Fool"
"Sail On"
"Don’t Wanna Cry No More"
"Break the Chain"
"Love is Love"
"Kiss Me for the Last Time"
"We've Got Tonight"
"All or Nothing"
"Only Love Will Set You Free"
"When The Hero Walks Alone"
"Blue Jay"
"No Secrets Call of the Wild"
"You Ain't Leavin'"
"What's the Matter Baby?"
"Hiding Inside Yourself"
"Can't Wait All Night"
"Keep It A Secret"
"Foolish Games"

Cassette bonus tracks:
"I Can Dream, Can't I?"
"Only Women Bleed"

1993 compilation albums
Elkie Brooks albums